Jerez de la Frontera railway station, is the main railway station of the Spanish city of Jerez de la Frontera, Andalusia. It opened in 1854 and served over 1.9 million passengers in 2018, of which 592,000 were Cercanías Cádiz passengers.

Services
Alvia services use the Madrid–Seville high-speed rail line as far as Seville-Santa Justa, and switches to the conventional rail network to serve Jerez and finally Cádiz, and one Media Distancia service between Cádiz and Jaén calls at Jerez. The Cercanías Cádiz commuter rail line also serves the station.

References

Railway stations in Andalusia
Buildings and structures in Jerez de la Frontera
Railway stations in Spain opened in 1854